The 2002–03 Minnesota Wild season was the team's third season in the National Hockey League (NHL). After qualifying for the Stanley Cup playoffs for the first time in franchise history, the Wild won two playoff series before losing in the Western Conference Final to the Mighty Ducks of Anaheim.

Off-season

Regular season
The Wild tied the Calgary Flames, Nashville Predators and Pittsburgh Penguins for most times shut-out with 10.

Final standings

Playoffs

The Wild are the only team in NHL history to rally back from 3–1 down twice in the same playoff.

Schedule and results

Regular season

|-  style="text-align:center; background:#cfc;"
|1||W||October 11, 2002||5–1 || style="text-align:left;"|  Boston Bruins (2002–03) ||1–0–0–0 || 
|- style="text-align:center;"
|2||T||October 12, 2002||2–2 OT|| style="text-align:left;"| @ St. Louis Blues (2002–03) ||1–0–1–0 || 
|-  style="text-align:center; background:#cfc;"
|3||W||October 15, 2002||4–1 || style="text-align:left;"|  Florida Panthers (2002–03) ||2–0–1–0 || 
|-  style="text-align:center; background:#cfc;"
|4||W||October 17, 2002||3–1 || style="text-align:left;"|  Dallas Stars (2002–03) ||3–0–1–0 || 
|-  style="text-align:center; background:#fbb;"
|5||L||October 19, 2002||3–5 || style="text-align:left;"|  Detroit Red Wings (2002–03) ||3–1–1–0 || 
|-  style="text-align:center; background:#cfc;"
|6||W||October 22, 2002||4–3 OT|| style="text-align:left;"|  Calgary Flames (2002–03) ||4–1–1–0 || 
|-  style="text-align:center; background:#cfc;"
|7||W||October 24, 2002||3–2 || style="text-align:left;"| @ Chicago Blackhawks (2002–03) ||5–1–1–0 || 
|-  style="text-align:center; background:#cfc;"
|8||W||October 26, 2002||6–1 || style="text-align:left;"| @ Phoenix Coyotes (2002–03) ||6–1–1–0 || 
|- style="text-align:center;"
|9||T||October 27, 2002||3–3 OT|| style="text-align:left;"| @ Colorado Avalanche (2002–03) ||6–1–2–0 || 
|-  style="text-align:center; background:#cfc;"
|10||W||October 29, 2002||3–2 OT|| style="text-align:left;"|  Colorado Avalanche (2002–03) ||7–1–2–0 || 
|-  style="text-align:center; background:#cfc;"
|11||W||October 31, 2002||2–1 OT|| style="text-align:left;"|  San Jose Sharks (2002–03) ||8–1–2–0 || 
|-

|-  style="text-align:center; background:#fbb;"
|12||L||November 2, 2002||2–4 || style="text-align:left;"|  Vancouver Canucks (2002–03) ||8–2–2–0 || 
|-  style="text-align:center; background:#cfc;"
|13||W||November 4, 2002||5–2 || style="text-align:left;"| @ Los Angeles Kings (2002–03) ||9–2–2–0 || 
|-  style="text-align:center; background:#fbb;"
|14||L||November 7, 2002||1–4 || style="text-align:left;"| @ Phoenix Coyotes (2002–03) ||9–3–2–0 || 
|-  style="text-align:center; background:#cfc;"
|15||W||November 9, 2002||4–2 || style="text-align:left;"| @ San Jose Sharks (2002–03) ||10–3–2–0 || 
|-  style="text-align:center; background:#fbb;"
|16||L||November 10, 2002||0–1 || style="text-align:left;"| @ Mighty Ducks of Anaheim (2002–03) ||10–4–2–0 || 
|-  style="text-align:center; background:#fbb;"
|17||L||November 12, 2002||2–3 || style="text-align:left;"|  Edmonton Oilers (2002–03) ||10–5–2–0 || 
|- style="text-align:center;"
|18||T||November 14, 2002||1–1 OT|| style="text-align:left;"|  Pittsburgh Penguins (2002–03) ||10–5–3–0 || 
|-  style="text-align:center; background:#cfc;"
|19||W||November 16, 2002||1–0 || style="text-align:left;"|  Washington Capitals (2002–03) ||11–5–3–0 || 
|- style="text-align:center;"
|20||T||November 19, 2002||2–2 OT|| style="text-align:left;"|  Los Angeles Kings (2002–03) ||11–5–4–0 || 
|-  style="text-align:center; background:#cfc;"
|21||W||November 21, 2002||4–3 || style="text-align:left;"| @ Washington Capitals (2002–03) ||12–5–4–0 || 
|-  style="text-align:center; background:#cfc;"
|22||W||November 23, 2002||4–2 || style="text-align:left;"|  Nashville Predators (2002–03) ||13–5–4–0 || 
|-  style="text-align:center; background:#fbb;"
|23||L||November 25, 2002||1–2 || style="text-align:left;"|  Vancouver Canucks (2002–03) ||13–6–4–0 || 
|-  style="text-align:center; background:#fbb;"
|24||L||November 27, 2002||0–5 || style="text-align:left;"| @ Dallas Stars (2002–03) ||13–7–4–0 || 
|- style="text-align:center;"
|25||T||November 29, 2002||2–2 OT|| style="text-align:left;"|  Colorado Avalanche (2002–03) ||13–7–5–0 || 
|-

|-  style="text-align:center; background:#FF6F6F;"
|26||OTL||December 3, 2002||1–2 OT|| style="text-align:left;"| @ Edmonton Oilers (2002–03) ||13–7–5–1 || 
|- style="text-align:center;"
|27||T||December 5, 2002||1–1 OT|| style="text-align:left;"| @ Calgary Flames (2002–03) ||13–7–6–1 || 
|-  style="text-align:center; background:#cfc;"
|28||W||December 7, 2002||4–2 || style="text-align:left;"| @ Vancouver Canucks (2002–03) ||14–7–6–1 || 
|-  style="text-align:center; background:#cfc;"
|29||W||December 10, 2002||5–3 || style="text-align:left;"|  Tampa Bay Lightning (2002–03) ||15–7–6–1 || 
|-  style="text-align:center; background:#cfc;"
|30||W||December 12, 2002||3–2 || style="text-align:left;"| @ Detroit Red Wings (2002–03) ||16–7–6–1 || 
|-  style="text-align:center; background:#fbb;"
|31||L||December 14, 2002||1–3 || style="text-align:left;"| @ Nashville Predators (2002–03) ||16–8–6–1 || 
|-  style="text-align:center; background:#cfc;"
|32||W||December 15, 2002||2–1 || style="text-align:left;"|  Carolina Hurricanes (2002–03) ||17–8–6–1 || 
|-  style="text-align:center; background:#cfc;"
|33||W||December 17, 2002||4–3 OT|| style="text-align:left;"|  Edmonton Oilers (2002–03) ||18–8–6–1 || 
|-  style="text-align:center; background:#fbb;"
|34||L||December 19, 2002||2–4 || style="text-align:left;"|  New York Islanders (2002–03) ||18–9–6–1 || 
|-  style="text-align:center; background:#fbb;"
|35||L||December 21, 2002||2–4 || style="text-align:left;"| @ Colorado Avalanche (2002–03) ||18–10–6–1 || 
|-  style="text-align:center; background:#fbb;"
|36||L||December 23, 2002||2–3 || style="text-align:left;"|  Calgary Flames (2002–03) ||18–11–6–1 || 
|- style="text-align:center;"
|37||T||December 26, 2002||2–2 OT|| style="text-align:left;"| @ Chicago Blackhawks (2002–03) ||18–11–7–1 || 
|-  style="text-align:center; background:#cfc;"
|38||W||December 28, 2002||4–3 || style="text-align:left;"| @ Buffalo Sabres (2002–03) ||19–11–7–1 || 
|-  style="text-align:center; background:#cfc;"
|39||W||December 31, 2002||4–1 || style="text-align:left;"|  Mighty Ducks of Anaheim (2002–03) ||20–11–7–1 || 
|-

|-  style="text-align:center; background:#cfc;"
|40||W||January 2, 2003||2–1 OT|| style="text-align:left;"| @ Edmonton Oilers (2002–03) ||21–11–7–1 || 
|-  style="text-align:center; background:#fbb;"
|41||L||January 4, 2003||2–3 || style="text-align:left;"| @ Calgary Flames (2002–03) ||21–12–7–1 || 
|-  style="text-align:center; background:#fbb;"
|42||L||January 6, 2003||2–3 || style="text-align:left;"|  Los Angeles Kings (2002–03) ||21–13–7–1 || 
|-  style="text-align:center; background:#fbb;"
|43||L||January 8, 2003||1–2 || style="text-align:left;"|  Columbus Blue Jackets (2002–03) ||21–14–7–1 || 
|-  style="text-align:center; background:#cfc;"
|44||W||January 10, 2003||2–1 || style="text-align:left;"|  Phoenix Coyotes (2002–03) ||22–14–7–1 || 
|-  style="text-align:center; background:#fbb;"
|45||L||January 14, 2003||0–1 || style="text-align:left;"|  Buffalo Sabres (2002–03) ||22–15–7–1 || 
|-  style="text-align:center; background:#cfc;"
|46||W||January 16, 2003||5–2 || style="text-align:left;"|  Vancouver Canucks (2002–03) ||23–15–7–1 || 
|-  style="text-align:center; background:#fbb;"
|47||L||January 18, 2003||0–1 || style="text-align:left;"|  Mighty Ducks of Anaheim (2002–03) ||23–16–7–1 || 
|-  style="text-align:center; background:#cfc;"
|48||W||January 20, 2003||2–1 OT|| style="text-align:left;"| @ Mighty Ducks of Anaheim (2002–03) ||24–16–7–1 || 
|-  style="text-align:center; background:#cfc;"
|49||W||January 23, 2003||2–1 || style="text-align:left;"| @ Los Angeles Kings (2002–03) ||25–16–7–1 || 
|-  style="text-align:center; background:#fbb;"
|50||L||January 25, 2003||1–4 || style="text-align:left;"| @ San Jose Sharks (2002–03) ||25–17–7–1 || 
|- style="text-align:center;"
|51||T||January 28, 2003||2–2 OT|| style="text-align:left;"| @ Vancouver Canucks (2002–03) ||25–17–8–1 || 
|-  style="text-align:center; background:#fbb;"
|52||L||January 29, 2003||1–5 || style="text-align:left;"| @ Edmonton Oilers (2002–03) ||25–18–8–1 || 
|-

|-  style="text-align:center; background:#cfc;"
|53||W||February 5, 2003||2–1 || style="text-align:left;"|  Chicago Blackhawks (2002–03) ||26–18–8–1 || 
|-  style="text-align:center; background:#cfc;"
|54||W||February 7, 2003||4–3 || style="text-align:left;"|  San Jose Sharks (2002–03) ||27–18–8–1 || 
|-  style="text-align:center; background:#fbb;"
|55||L||February 9, 2003||2–3 || style="text-align:left;"| @ New Jersey Devils (2002–03) ||27–19–8–1 || 
|-  style="text-align:center; background:#cfc;"
|56||W||February 10, 2003||1–0 || style="text-align:left;"| @ Philadelphia Flyers (2002–03) ||28–19–8–1 || 
|-  style="text-align:center; background:#cfc;"
|57||W||February 12, 2003||2–0 || style="text-align:left;"|  Philadelphia Flyers (2002–03) ||29–19–8–1 || 
|-  style="text-align:center; background:#fbb;"
|58||L||February 14, 2003||2–3 || style="text-align:left;"|  Phoenix Coyotes (2002–03) ||29–20–8–1 || 
|-  style="text-align:center; background:#fbb;"
|59||L||February 15, 2003||2–3 || style="text-align:left;"| @ Colorado Avalanche (2002–03) ||29–21–8–1 || 
|-  style="text-align:center; background:#fbb;"
|60||L||February 19, 2003||2–4 || style="text-align:left;"|  New York Rangers (2002–03) ||29–22–8–1 || 
|-  style="text-align:center; background:#cfc;"
|61||W||February 23, 2003||3–1 || style="text-align:left;"|  St. Louis Blues (2002–03) ||30–22–8–1 || 
|-  style="text-align:center; background:#cfc;"
|62||W||February 25, 2003||3–0 || style="text-align:left;"| @ Ottawa Senators (2002–03) ||31–22–8–1 || 
|-  style="text-align:center; background:#cfc;"
|63||W||February 27, 2003||6–3 || style="text-align:left;"| @ Montreal Canadiens (2002–03) ||32–22–8–1 || 
|-

|-  style="text-align:center; background:#fbb;"
|64||L||March 1, 2003||0–2 || style="text-align:left;"| @ St. Louis Blues (2002–03) ||32–23–8–1 || 
|-  style="text-align:center; background:#cfc;"
|65||W||March 4, 2003||3–2 || style="text-align:left;"|  New Jersey Devils (2002–03) ||33–23–8–1 || 
|- style="text-align:center;"
|66||T||March 6, 2003||2–2 OT|| style="text-align:left;"| @ Nashville Predators (2002–03) ||33–23–9–1 || 
|-  style="text-align:center; background:#fbb;"
|67||L||March 7, 2003||0–1 || style="text-align:left;"| @ Carolina Hurricanes (2002–03) ||33–24–9–1 || 
|-  style="text-align:center; background:#cfc;"
|68||W||March 9, 2003||6–4 || style="text-align:left;"| @ Atlanta Thrashers (2002–03) ||34–24–9–1 || 
|-  style="text-align:center; background:#cfc;"
|69||W||March 12, 2003||4–2 || style="text-align:left;"|  Dallas Stars (2002–03) ||35–24–9–1 || 
|-  style="text-align:center; background:#cfc;"
|70||W||March 14, 2003||3–1 || style="text-align:left;"|  Nashville Predators (2002–03) ||36–24–9–1 || 
|-  style="text-align:center; background:#fbb;"
|71||L||March 15, 2003||0–5 || style="text-align:left;"| @ Columbus Blue Jackets (2002–03) ||36–25–9–1 || 
|- style="text-align:center;"
|72||T||March 17, 2003||3–3 OT|| style="text-align:left;"| @ Tampa Bay Lightning (2002–03) ||36–25–10–1 || 
|-  style="text-align:center; background:#cfc;"
|73||W||March 19, 2003||3–1 || style="text-align:left;"| @ Florida Panthers (2002–03) ||37–25–10–1 || 
|-  style="text-align:center; background:#cfc;"
|74||W||March 21, 2003||3–2 OT|| style="text-align:left;"| @ Dallas Stars (2002–03) ||38–25–10–1 || 
|-  style="text-align:center; background:#cfc;"
|75||W||March 23, 2003||4–0 || style="text-align:left;"|  Detroit Red Wings (2002–03) ||39–25–10–1 || 
|-  style="text-align:center; background:#fbb;"
|76||L||March 25, 2003||0–4 || style="text-align:left;"| @ Detroit Red Wings (2002–03) ||39–26–10–1 || 
|-  style="text-align:center; background:#fbb;"
|77||L||March 26, 2003||0–1 || style="text-align:left;"|  St. Louis Blues (2002–03) ||39–27–10–1 || 
|-  style="text-align:center; background:#cfc;"
|78||W||March 28, 2003||4–3 OT|| style="text-align:left;"|  Chicago Blackhawks (2002–03) ||40–27–10–1 || 
|-  style="text-align:center; background:#cfc;"
|79||W||March 31, 2003||3–0 || style="text-align:left;"|  Calgary Flames (2002–03) ||41–27–10–1 || 
|-

|-  style="text-align:center; background:#fbb;"
|80||L||April 2, 2003||0–3 || style="text-align:left;"| @ Columbus Blue Jackets (2002–03) ||41–28–10–1 || 
|-  style="text-align:center; background:#fbb;"
|81||L||April 3, 2003||1–2 || style="text-align:left;"| @ Toronto Maple Leafs (2002–03) ||41–29–10–1 || 
|-  style="text-align:center; background:#cfc;"
|82||W||April 6, 2003||4–3 || style="text-align:left;"|  Columbus Blue Jackets (2002–03) ||42–29–10–1 || 
|-

|-
| Legend:

Playoffs

|- align="center" bgcolor="#bbffbb"
| 1 || April 10 || Minnesota || 4–2 || Colorado || || Roloson || 18,007 || Wild lead 1–0 || 
|- align="center" bgcolor="#ffbbbb"
| 2 || April 12 || Minnesota || 2–3 || Colorado || || Roloson || 18,007 || Series tied 1–1 || 
|- align="center" bgcolor="#ffbbbb"    
| 3 || April 14 || Colorado || 3–0 || Minnesota || || Roloson || 19,354 || Avalanche lead 2–1 || 
|- align="center" bgcolor="#ffbbbb" 
| 4 || April 16 || Colorado || 3–1 || Minnesota || || Roloson || 19,350 || Avalanche lead 3–1 || 
|- align="center" bgcolor="#bbffbb"
| 5 || April 19 || Minnesota || 3–2 || Colorado || || Fernandez || 18,007 || Avalanche lead 3–2 || 
|- align="center" bgcolor="#bbffbb"
| 6 || April 21 || Colorado || 2–3  || Minnesota || OT || Fernandez || 19,350 || Series tied 3–3 || 
|- align="center" bgcolor="#bbffbb"
| 7 || April 22 || Minnesota || 3–2  || Colorado || OT || Fernandez || 18,007 || Wild win 4–3 || 
|-

|- align="center" bgcolor="#ffbbbb"
| 1 || April 25 || Minnesota || 3–4 || Vancouver || OT || Fernandez || 18,514 || Canucks lead 1–0 || 
|- align="center" bgcolor="#bbffbb"
| 2 || April 27 || Minnesota || 3–2 || Vancouver || || Roloson || 18,514 || Series tied 1–1 || 
|- align="center" bgcolor="#ffbbbb"    
| 3 || April 29 || Vancouver || 3–2 || Minnesota || || Roloson || 19,394 || Canucks lead 2–1 || 
|- align="center" bgcolor="#ffbbbb"
| 4 || May 2 || Vancouver || 3–2 || Minnesota || OT || Fernandez || 19,386 || Canucks lead 3–1 || 
|- align="center" bgcolor="#bbffbb"
| 5 || May 5 || Minnesota || 7–2 || Vancouver || ||  Roloson || 18,514 || Canucks lead 3–2 || 
|- align="center" bgcolor="#bbffbb"
| 6 || May 7 || Vancouver || 1–5 || Minnesota || || Roloson || 19,350 || Series tied 3–3 || 
|- align="center" bgcolor="#bbffbb"
| 7 || May 8 || Minnesota || 4–2 || Vancouver || || Roloson || 18,514 || Wild win 4–3 || 
|-

|- align="center" bgcolor="#ffbbbb"
| 1 || May 10 || Anaheim || 1–0 || Minnesota || 2OT || Fernandez || 19,350 || Mighty Ducks lead 1–0 || 
|- align="center" bgcolor="#ffbbbb"
| 2 || May 12 || Anaheim || 2–0 || Minnesota || || Roloson || 19,350 || Mighty Ducks lead 2–0 || 
|- align="center" bgcolor="#ffbbbb"    
| 3 || May 14 || Minnesota || 0–4 || Anaheim || || Roloson || 17,174 || Mighty Ducks lead 3–0 || 
|- align="center" bgcolor="#ffbbbb"
| 4 || May 16 || Minnesota || 1–2 || Anaheim || || Fernandez || 17,174 || Mighty Ducks win 4–0 || 
|-

|-
| Legend:

Player statistics

Scoring
 Position abbreviations: C = Center; D = Defense; G = Goaltender; LW = Left Wing; RW = Right Wing
  = Joined team via a transaction (e.g., trade, waivers, signing) during the season. Stats reflect time with the Wild only.
  = Left team via a transaction (e.g., trade, waivers, release) during the season. Stats reflect time with the Wild only.

Goaltending

Awards and records

Awards

Transactions
The Wild were involved in the following transactions from June 14, 2002, the day after the deciding game of the 2002 Stanley Cup Finals, through June 9, 2003, the day of the deciding game of the 2003 Stanley Cup Finals.

Trades

Players acquired

Players lost

Signings

Draft picks
Minnesota's draft picks at the 2002 NHL Entry Draft held at the Air Canada Centre in Toronto, Ontario.

See also
2002–03 NHL season

Notes

References

Minn
Minn
Minnesota Wild seasons